Satoshi Maruo (born 28 November 1991) is a Japanese male athlete competing in the 50 kilometres race walk. He represented Japan at the 2016 IAAF World Race Walking Team Championships and the 2017 World Championships in Athletics, finishing fifth at the latter event in a personal best of 3:43:03 hours The Japanese team was very successful at the event with all three men finishing in the top five. He is a member of the Aichi Steel athletics team.

International competitions

References

External links

Profile at Aichi Steel Truck and Field Team 

Living people
1991 births
Japanese male racewalkers
World Athletics Championships athletes for Japan
Athletes (track and field) at the 2018 Asian Games
Asian Games competitors for Japan
Athletes (track and field) at the 2020 Summer Olympics
Olympic athletes of Japan
20th-century Japanese people
21st-century Japanese people